Truth is the property of being in accord with fact or reality. In everyday language, truth is typically ascribed to things that aim to represent reality or otherwise correspond to it, such as beliefs, propositions, and declarative sentences.

Truth is usually held to be the opposite of falsehood. The concept of truth is discussed and debated in various contexts, including philosophy, art, theology, and science. Most human activities depend upon the concept, where its nature as a concept is assumed rather than being a subject of discussion; these include most of the sciences, law, journalism, and everyday life. Some philosophers view the concept of truth as basic, and unable to be explained in any terms that are more easily understood than the concept of truth itself. Most commonly, truth is viewed as the correspondence of language or thought to a mind-independent world. This is called the correspondence theory of truth.

Various theories and views of truth continue to be debated among scholars, philosophers, and theologians. There are many different questions about the nature of truth which are still the subject of contemporary debates, such as: the question of defining truth. If it is even possible to give an informative definition of truth. Identifying things are truth-bearers and are therefore capable of being true or false. If truth and falsehood are bivalent, or if there are other truth values. Identifying the criteria of truth that allow us to identify it and to distinguish it from falsehood. The role that truth plays in constituting knowledge. And if truth is always absolute, or if it can be relative to one's perspective.

Definition and etymology

The English word truth is derived from Old English tríewþ, tréowþ, trýwþ, Middle English trewþe, cognate to Old High German triuwida, Old Norse tryggð. Like troth, it is a -th nominalisation of the adjective true (Old English tréowe).

The English word true is from Old English (West Saxon) (ge)tríewe, tréowe, cognate to Old Saxon (gi)trûui, Old High German (ga)triuwu (Modern German treu "faithful"), Old Norse tryggr, Gothic triggws, all from a Proto-Germanic *trewwj- "having good faith", perhaps ultimately from PIE *dru- "tree", on the notion of "steadfast as an oak" (e.g., Sanskrit dā́ru "(piece of) wood").
Old Norse , "faith, word of honour; religious faith, belief" (archaic English troth "loyalty, honesty, good faith", compare ).

Thus, "truth" involves both the quality of "faithfulness, fidelity, loyalty, sincerity, veracity", and that of "agreement with fact or reality", in Anglo-Saxon expressed by sōþ (Modern English sooth).

All Germanic languages besides English have introduced a terminological distinction between truth "fidelity" and truth "factuality". To express "factuality", North Germanic opted for nouns derived from sanna "to assert, affirm", while continental West Germanic (German and Dutch) opted for continuations of wâra "faith, trust, pact" (cognate to Slavic věra "(religious) faith", but influenced by Latin verus). Romance languages use terms following the Latin veritas, while the Greek aletheia, Russian pravda, South Slavic istina and Sanskrit sat (related to English sooth and North Germanic sanna) have separate etymological origins.

In some modern contexts, the word "truth" is used to refer to fidelity to an original or standard. It can also be used in the context of being "true to oneself" in the sense of acting with authenticity.

Major theories

The question of what is a proper basis for deciding how words, symbols, ideas and beliefs may properly be considered true, whether by a single person or an entire society, is dealt with by the five most prevalent substantive theories of truth listed below. Each presents perspectives that are widely shared by published scholars.

Theories other than the most prevalent substantive theories are also discussed. According to a survey of professional philosophers and others on their philosophical views which was carried out in November 2009 (taken by 3226 respondents, including 1803 philosophy faculty members and/or PhDs and 829 philosophy graduate students) 45% of respondents accept or lean towards correspondence theories, 21% accept or lean towards deflationary theories and 14% epistemic theories.

Substantive

Correspondence

Correspondence theories emphasize that true beliefs and true statements correspond to the actual state of affairs. This type of theory stresses a relationship between thoughts or statements on one hand, and things or objects on the other. It is a traditional model tracing its origins to ancient Greek philosophers such as Socrates, Plato, and Aristotle. This class of theories holds that the truth or the falsity of a representation is determined in principle entirely by how it relates to "things" by whether it accurately describes those "things". A classic example of correspondence theory is the statement by the thirteenth century philosopher and theologian Thomas Aquinas: "Veritas est adaequatio rei et intellectus" ("Truth is the adequation of things and intellect"), which Aquinas attributed to the ninth century Neoplatonist Isaac Israeli. Aquinas also restated the theory as: "A judgment is said to be true when it conforms to the external reality".

Correspondence theory centres heavily around the assumption that truth is a matter of accurately copying what is known as "objective reality" and then representing it in thoughts, words and other symbols. Many modern theorists have stated that this ideal cannot be achieved without analysing additional factors. For example, language plays a role in that all languages have words to represent concepts that are virtually undefined in other languages. The German word Zeitgeist is one such example: one who speaks or understands the language may "know" what it means, but any translation of the word apparently fails to accurately capture its full meaning (this is a problem with many abstract words, especially those derived in agglutinative languages). Thus, some words add an additional parameter to the construction of an accurate truth predicate. Among the philosophers who grappled with this problem is Alfred Tarski, whose semantic theory is summarized further on.

Proponents of several of the theories below have gone further to assert that there are yet other issues necessary to the analysis, such as interpersonal power struggles, community interactions, personal biases and other factors involved in deciding what is seen as truth.

Coherence

For coherence theories in general, truth requires a proper fit of elements within a whole system. Very often, though, coherence is taken to imply something more than simple logical consistency; often there is a demand that the propositions in a coherent system lend mutual inferential support to each other. So, for example, the completeness and comprehensiveness of the underlying set of concepts is a critical factor in judging the validity and usefulness of a coherent system. A pervasive tenet of coherence theories is the idea that truth is primarily a property of whole systems of propositions, and can be ascribed to individual propositions only according to their coherence with the whole. Among the assortment of perspectives commonly regarded as coherence theory, theorists differ on the question of whether coherence entails many possible true systems of thought or only a single absolute system.

Some variants of coherence theory are claimed to describe the essential and intrinsic properties of formal systems in logic and mathematics. However, formal reasoners are content to contemplate axiomatically independent and sometimes mutually contradictory systems side by side, for example, the various alternative geometries. On the whole, coherence theories have been rejected for lacking justification in their application to other areas of truth, especially with respect to assertions about the natural world, empirical data in general, assertions about practical matters of psychology and society, especially when used without support from the other major theories of truth.

Coherence theories distinguish the thought of rationalist philosophers, particularly of Baruch Spinoza, Gottfried Wilhelm Leibniz, and Georg Wilhelm Friedrich Hegel, along with the British philosopher F. H. Bradley. They have found a resurgence also among several proponents of logical positivism, notably Otto Neurath and Carl Hempel.

Pragmatic

The three most influential forms of the pragmatic theory of truth were introduced around the turn of the 20th century by Charles Sanders Peirce, William James, and John Dewey. Although there are wide differences in viewpoint among these and other proponents of pragmatic theory, they hold in common that truth is verified and confirmed by the results of putting one's concepts into practice.

Peirce defines truth as follows: "Truth is that concordance of an abstract statement with the ideal limit towards which endless investigation would tend to bring scientific belief, which concordance the abstract statement may possess by virtue of the confession of its inaccuracy and one-sidedness, and this confession is an essential ingredient of truth." This statement stresses Peirce's view that ideas of approximation, incompleteness, and partiality, what he describes elsewhere as fallibilism and "reference to the future", are essential to a proper conception of truth. Although Peirce uses words like concordance and correspondence to describe one aspect of the pragmatic sign relation, he is also quite explicit in saying that definitions of truth based on mere correspondence are no more than nominal definitions, which he accords a lower status than real definitions.

William James's version of pragmatic theory, while complex, is often summarized by his statement that "the 'true' is only the expedient in our way of thinking, just as the 'right' is only the expedient in our way of behaving." By this, James meant that truth is a quality, the value of which is confirmed by its effectiveness when applying concepts to practice (thus, "pragmatic").

John Dewey, less broadly than James but more broadly than Peirce, held that inquiry, whether scientific, technical, sociological, philosophical or cultural, is self-corrective over time if openly submitted for testing by a community of inquirers in order to clarify, justify, refine and/or refute proposed truths.

Though not widely known, a new variation of the pragmatic theory was defined and wielded successfully from the 20th century forward. Defined and named by William Ernest Hocking, this variation is known as "negative pragmatism". Essentially, what works may or may not be true, but what fails cannot be true because the truth always works. Richard Feynman also ascribed to it: "We never are definitely right, we can only be sure we are wrong." This approach incorporates many of the ideas from Peirce, James, and Dewey. For Peirce, the idea of "... endless investigation would tend to bring about scientific belief ..." fits negative pragmatism in that a negative pragmatist would never stop testing. As Feynman noted, an idea or theory "... could never be proved right, because tomorrow's experiment might succeed in proving wrong what you thought was right." Similarly, James and Dewey's ideas also ascribe truth to repeated testing which is "self-corrective" over time.

Pragmatism and negative pragmatism are also closely aligned with the coherence theory of truth in that any testing should not be isolated but rather incorporate knowledge from all human endeavors and experience. The universe is a whole and integrated system, and testing should acknowledge and account for its diversity. As Feynman said, "... if it disagrees with experiment, it is wrong."

Constructivist

Social constructivism holds that truth is constructed by social processes, is historically and culturally specific, and that it is in part shaped through the power struggles within a community. Constructivism views all of our knowledge as "constructed," because it does not reflect any external "transcendent" realities (as a pure correspondence theory might hold). Rather, perceptions of truth are viewed as contingent on convention, human perception, and social experience. It is believed by constructivists that representations of physical and biological reality, including race, sexuality, and gender, are socially constructed.

Giambattista Vico was among the first to claim that history and culture were man-made. Vico's epistemological orientation gathers the most diverse rays and unfolds in one axiom—verum ipsum factum—"truth itself is constructed". Hegel and Marx were among the other early proponents of the premise that truth is, or can be, socially constructed. Marx, like many critical theorists who followed, did not reject the existence of objective truth but rather distinguished between true knowledge and knowledge that has been distorted through power or ideology. For Marx, scientific and true knowledge is "in accordance with the dialectical understanding of history" and ideological knowledge is "an epiphenomenal expression of the relation of material forces in a given economic arrangement".

Consensus

Consensus theory holds that truth is whatever is agreed upon, or in some versions, might come to be agreed upon, by some specified group. Such a group might include all human beings, or a subset thereof consisting of more than one person.

Among the current advocates of consensus theory as a useful accounting of the concept of "truth" is the philosopher Jürgen Habermas. Habermas maintains that truth is what would be agreed upon in an ideal speech situation. Among the current strong critics of consensus theory is the philosopher Nicholas Rescher.

Minimalist

Deflationary

Modern developments in the field of philosophy have resulted in the rise of a new thesis: that the term truth does not denote a real property of sentences or propositions. This thesis is in part a response to the common use of truth predicates (e.g., that some particular thing "...is true") which was particularly prevalent in philosophical discourse on truth in the first half of the 20th century. From this point of view, to assert that "'2 + 2 = 4' is true" is logically equivalent to asserting that "2 + 2 = 4", and the phrase "is true" is completely dispensable in this and every other context. In common parlance, truth predicates are not commonly heard, and it would be interpreted as an unusual occurrence were someone to utilise a truth predicate in an everyday conversation when asserting that something is true. Newer perspectives that take this discrepancy into account and work with sentence structures that are actually employed in common discourse can be broadly described:
 as deflationary theories of truth, since they attempt to deflate the presumed importance of the words "true" or truth,
 as disquotational theories, to draw attention to the disappearance of the quotation marks in cases like the above example, or
 as minimalist theories of truth.

Whichever term is used, deflationary theories can be said to hold in common that "[t]he predicate 'true' is an expressive convenience, not the name of a property requiring deep analysis." Once we have identified the truth predicate's formal features and utility, deflationists argue, we have said all there is to be said about truth. Among the theoretical concerns of these views is to explain away those special cases where it does appear that the concept of truth has peculiar and interesting properties. (See, e.g., Semantic paradoxes, and below.)

In addition to highlighting such formal aspects of the predicate "is true", some deflationists point out that the concept enables us to express things that might otherwise require infinitely long sentences. For example, one cannot express confidence in Michael's accuracy by asserting the endless sentence:
Michael says, 'snow is white' and snow is white, or he says 'roses are red' and roses are red or he says ... etc.
This assertion can also be succinctly expressed by saying: What Michael says is true.

Performative
Attributed to P. F. Strawson is the performative theory of truth which holds that to say "'Snow is white' is true" is to perform the speech act of signaling one's agreement with the claim that snow is white (much like nodding one's head in agreement). The idea that some statements are more actions than communicative statements is not as odd as it may seem. For example, when a wedding couple says "I do" at the appropriate time in a wedding, they are performing the act of taking the other to be their lawful wedded spouse. They are not describing themselves as taking the other, but actually doing so (perhaps the most thorough analysis of such "illocutionary acts" is J. L. Austin, "How to Do Things With Words").

Strawson holds that a similar analysis is applicable to all speech acts, not just illocutionary ones: "To say a statement is true is not to make a statement about a statement, but rather to perform the act of agreeing with, accepting, or endorsing a statement. When one says 'It's true that it's raining,' one asserts no more than 'It's raining.' The function of [the statement] 'It's true that...' is to agree with, accept, or endorse the statement that 'it's raining.'"

Redundancy and related

According to the redundancy theory of truth, asserting that a statement is true is completely equivalent to asserting the statement itself. For example, making the assertion that " 'Snow is white' is true" is equivalent to asserting "Snow is white". Redundancy theorists infer from this premise that truth is a redundant concept; that is, it is merely a word that is traditionally used in conversation or writing, generally for emphasis, but not a word that actually equates to anything in reality. This theory is commonly attributed to Frank P. Ramsey, who held that the use of words like fact and truth was nothing but a roundabout way of asserting a proposition, and that treating these words as separate problems in isolation from judgment was merely a "linguistic muddle".

A variant of redundancy theory is the disquotational theory which uses a modified form of Tarski's schema: To say that '"P" is true' is to say that P. A version of this theory was defended by C. J. F. Williams in his book What is Truth? Yet another version of deflationism is the prosentential theory of truth, first developed by Dorothy Grover, Joseph Camp, and Nuel Belnap as an elaboration of Ramsey's claims. They argue that sentences like "That's true", when said in response to "It's raining", are prosentences, expressions that merely repeat the content of other expressions. In the same way that it means the same as my dog in the sentence My dog was hungry, so I fed it, That's true is supposed to mean the same as It's raining—if one says the latter and another then says the former. These variations do not necessarily follow Ramsey in asserting that truth is not a property, but rather can be understood to say that, for instance, the assertion "P" may well involve a substantial truth, and the theorists in this case are minimizing only the redundancy or prosentence involved in the statement such as "that's true".

Deflationary principles do not apply to representations that are not analogous to sentences, and also do not apply to many other things that are commonly judged to be true or otherwise.

Philosophical skepticism

Philosophical skepticism is generally any questioning attitude or doubt towards one or more items of knowledge or belief which ascribe truth to their assertions and propositions. The primary target of philosophical skepticism is epistemology, but it can be applied to any domain, such as the supernatural, morality (moral skepticism), and religion (skepticism about the existence of God).

Philosophical skepticism comes in various forms. Radical forms of skepticism deny that knowledge or rational belief is possible and urge us to suspend judgment regarding ascription of truth on many or all controversial matters. More moderate forms of skepticism claim only that nothing can be known with certainty, or that we can know little or nothing about the "big questions" in life, such as whether God exists or whether there is an afterlife. Religious skepticism is "doubt concerning basic religious principles (such as immortality, providence, and revelation)". Scientific skepticism concerns testing beliefs for reliability, by subjecting them to systematic investigation using the scientific method, to discover empirical evidence for them.

Pluralist

Several of the major theories of truth hold that there is a particular property the having of which makes a belief or proposition true. Pluralist theories of truth assert that there may be more than one property that makes propositions true: ethical propositions might be true by virtue of coherence. Propositions about the physical world might be true by corresponding to the objects and properties they are about.

Some of the pragmatic theories, such as those by Charles Peirce and William James, included aspects of correspondence, coherence and constructivist theories. Crispin Wright argued in his 1992 book Truth and Objectivity that any predicate which satisfied certain platitudes about truth qualified as a truth predicate. In some discourses, Wright argued, the role of the truth predicate might be played by the notion of superassertibility. Michael Lynch, in a 2009 book Truth as One and Many, argued that we should see truth as a functional property capable of being multiply manifested in distinct properties like correspondence or coherence.

Formal theories

Logic

Logic is concerned with the patterns in reason that can help tell if a proposition is true or not. Logicians use formal languages to express the truths which they are concerned with, and as such there is only truth under some interpretation or truth within some logical system.

A logical truth (also called an analytic truth or a necessary truth) is a statement which is true in all possible worlds or under all possible interpretations, as contrasted to a fact (also called a synthetic claim or a contingency) which is only true in this world as it has historically unfolded. A proposition such as "If p and q, then p" is considered to be a logical truth because of the meaning of the symbols and words in it and not because of any fact of any particular world. They are such that they could not be untrue.

Degrees of truth in logic may be represented using two or more discrete values, as with bivalent logic (or binary logic), three-valued logic, and other forms of finite-valued logic. Truth in logic can be represented using numbers comprising a continuous range, typically between 0 and 1, as with fuzzy logic and other forms of infinite-valued logic. In general, the concept of representing truth using more than two values is known as many-valued logic.

Mathematics
 

There are two main approaches to truth in mathematics. They are the model theory of truth and the proof theory of truth.

Historically, with the nineteenth century development of Boolean algebra mathematical models of logic began to treat "truth", also represented as "T" or "1", as an arbitrary constant. "Falsity" is also an arbitrary constant, which can be represented as "F" or "0". In propositional logic, these symbols can be manipulated according to a set of axioms and rules of inference, often given in the form of truth tables.

In addition, from at least the time of Hilbert's program at the turn of the twentieth century to the proof of Gödel's incompleteness theorems and the development of the Church–Turing thesis in the early part of that century, true statements in mathematics were generally assumed to be those statements that are provable in a formal axiomatic system.

The works of Kurt Gödel, Alan Turing, and others shook this assumption, with the development of statements that are true but cannot be proven within the system. Two examples of the latter can be found in Hilbert's problems. Work on Hilbert's 10th problem led in the late twentieth century to the construction of specific Diophantine equations for which it is undecidable whether they have a solution, or even if they do, whether they have a finite or infinite number of solutions. More fundamentally, Hilbert's first problem was on the continuum hypothesis. Gödel and Paul Cohen showed that this hypothesis cannot be proved or disproved using the standard axioms of set theory. In the view of some, then, it is equally reasonable to take either the continuum hypothesis or its negation as a new axiom.

Gödel thought that the ability to perceive the truth of a mathematical or logical proposition is a matter of intuition, an ability he admitted could be ultimately beyond the scope of a formal theory of logic or mathematics and perhaps best considered in the realm of human comprehension and communication, but commented:

Tarski's semantics

The semantic theory of truth has as its general case for a given language:
'P' is true if and only if P
where 'P' refers to the sentence (the sentence's name), and P is just the sentence itself.

Tarski's theory of truth (named after Alfred Tarski) was developed for formal languages, such as formal logic. Here he restricted it in this way: no language could contain its own truth predicate, that is, the expression is true could only apply to sentences in some other language. The latter he called an object language, the language being talked about. (It may, in turn, have a truth predicate that can be applied to sentences in still another language.) The reason for his restriction was that languages that contain their own truth predicate will contain paradoxical sentences such as, "This sentence is not true". As a result, Tarski held that the semantic theory could not be applied to any natural language, such as English, because they contain their own truth predicates. Donald Davidson used it as the foundation of his truth-conditional semantics and linked it to radical interpretation in a form of coherentism.

Bertrand Russell is credited with noticing the existence of such paradoxes even in the best symbolic formations of mathematics in his day, in particular the paradox that came to be named after him, Russell's paradox. Russell and Whitehead attempted to solve these problems in Principia Mathematica by putting statements into a hierarchy of types, wherein a statement cannot refer to itself, but only to statements lower in the hierarchy. This in turn led to new orders of difficulty regarding the precise natures of types and the structures of conceptually possible type systems that have yet to be resolved to this day.

Kripke's semantics

Kripke's theory of truth (named after Saul Kripke) contends that a natural language can in fact contain its own truth predicate without giving rise to contradiction. He showed how to construct one as follows:
 Beginning with a subset of sentences of a natural language that contains no occurrences of the expression "is true" (or "is false"). So The barn is big is included in the subset, but not "The barn is big is true", nor problematic sentences such as "This sentence is false".
 Defining truth just for the sentences in that subset.
 Extending the definition of truth to include sentences that predicate truth or falsity of one of the original subset of sentences. So "The barn is big is true" is now included, but not either "This sentence is false" nor "'The barn is big is true' is true".
 Defining truth for all sentences that predicate truth or falsity of a member of the second set. Imagine this process repeated infinitely, so that truth is defined for The barn is big; then for "The barn is big is true"; then for "'The barn is big is true' is true", and so on.

Truth never gets defined for sentences like This sentence is false, since it was not in the original subset and does not predicate truth of any sentence in the original or any subsequent set. In Kripke's terms, these are "ungrounded." Since these sentences are never assigned either truth or falsehood even if the process is carried out infinitely, Kripke's theory implies that some sentences are neither true nor false. This contradicts the principle of bivalence: every sentence must be either true or false. Since this principle is a key premise in deriving the liar paradox, the paradox is dissolved.

However, it has been shown by Gödel that self-reference cannot be avoided naively, since propositions about seemingly unrelated objects can have an informal self-referential meaning; in Gödel's work, these objects are integer numbers, and they have an informal meaning regarding propositions. In fact, this idea — manifested by the diagonal lemma—is the basis for Tarski's theorem that truth cannot be consistently defined.

It has thus been claimed that Kripke's system indeed leads to contradiction: while its truth predicate is only partial, it does give truth value (true/false) to propositions such as the one built in Tarski's proof, and is therefore inconsistent. While there is still a debate on whether Tarski's proof can be implemented to every similar partial truth system, none have been shown to be consistent by acceptable methods used in mathematical logic.

Kripke's semantics are related to the use of topoi and other concepts from category theory in the study of mathematical logic. They provide a choice of formal semantics for intuitionistic logic.

Folk beliefs
The truth predicate "P is true" has great practical value in human language, allowing efficient endorsement or impeaching of claims made by others, to emphasize the truth or falsity of a statement, or to enable various indirect (Gricean) conversational implications. Individuals or societies will sometime punish "false" statements to deter falsehoods; the oldest surviving law text, the Code of Ur-Nammu, lists penalties for false accusations of sorcery or adultery, as well as for committing perjury in court. Even four-year-old children can pass simple "false belief" tests and successfully assess that another individual's belief diverges from reality in a specific way; by adulthood there are strong implicit intuitions about "truth" that form a "folk theory" of truth. These intuitions include:
 Capture (T-in): If P, then P is true
 Release (T-out): If P is true, then P
 Noncontradiction: A statement can not be both true and false
 Normativity: It is usually good to believe what is true
 False beliefs: The notion that believing a statement does not necessarily make it true

Like many folk theories, the folk theory of truth is useful in everyday life but, upon deep analysis, turns out to be technically self-contradictory; in particular, any formal system that fully obeys "capture and release" semantics for truth (also known as the T-schema), and that also respects classical logic, is provably inconsistent and succumbs to the liar paradox or to a similar contradiction.

Notable views

Ancient Greek philosophy

Socrates', Plato's and Aristotle's ideas about truth are seen by some as consistent with correspondence theory. In his Metaphysics, Aristotle stated: "To say of what is that it is not, or of what is not that it is, is false, while to say of what is that it is, and of what is not that it is not, is true". The Stanford Encyclopedia of Philosophy proceeds to say of Aristotle:

[...] Aristotle sounds much more like a genuine correspondence theorist in the Categories (12b11, 14b14), where he talks of "underlying things" that make statements true and implies that these "things" (pragmata) are logically structured situations or facts (viz., his sitting, his not sitting). Most influential is his claim in De Interpretatione (16a3) that thoughts are "likenesses" (homoiosis) of things. Although he nowhere defines truth in terms of a thought's likeness to a thing or fact, it is clear that such a definition would fit well into his overall philosophy of mind. [...]

Similar statements can also be found in Plato's dialogues (Cratylus 385b2, Sophist 263b).

Some Greek philosophers maintained that truth was either not accessible to mortals, or of greatly limited accessibility, forming early philosophical skepticism. Among these were Xenophanes, Democritus, and Pyrrho, the founder of Pyrrhonism, who argued that there was no criterion of truth.

The Epicureans believed that all sense perceptions were true, and that errors arise in how we judge those perceptions.

The Stoics conceived truth as accessible from impressions via cognitive grasping.

Medieval philosophy

Avicenna (980–1037)
In early Islamic philosophy, Avicenna (Ibn Sina) defined truth in his work Kitab Al-Shifa The Book of Healing, Book I, Chapter 8, as:

Avicenna elaborated on his definition of truth later in Book VIII, Chapter 6:

However, this definition is merely a rendering of the medieval Latin translation of the work by Simone van Riet. A modern translation of the original Arabic text states:

Aquinas (1225–1274)
Reevaluating Avicenna, and also Augustine and Aristotle, Thomas Aquinas stated in his Disputed Questions on Truth:

Thus, for Aquinas, the truth of the human intellect (logical truth) is based on the truth in things (ontological truth). Following this, he wrote an elegant re-statement of Aristotle's view in his Summa I.16.1:

 Aquinas also said that real things participate in the act of being of the Creator God who is Subsistent Being, Intelligence, and Truth. Thus, these beings possess the light of intelligibility and are knowable. These things (beings; reality) are the foundation of the truth that is found in the human mind, when it acquires knowledge of things, first through the senses, then through the understanding and the judgement done by reason. For Aquinas, human intelligence ("intus", within and "legere", to read) has the capability to reach the essence and existence of things because it has a non-material, spiritual element, although some moral, educational, and other elements might interfere with its capability.

Changing concepts of truth in the Middle Ages
Richard Firth Green examined the concept of truth in the later Middle Ages in his A Crisis of Truth, and concludes that roughly during the reign of Richard II of England the very meaning of the concept changes. The idea of the oath, which was so much part and parcel of for instance Romance literature, changes from a subjective concept to a more objective one (in Derek Pearsall's summary). Whereas truth (the "trouthe" of Sir Gawain and the Green Knight) was first "an ethical truth in which truth is understood to reside in persons", in Ricardian England it "transforms...into a political truth in which truth is understood to reside in documents".

Modern philosophy

Kant (1724–1804)
Immanuel Kant endorses a definition of truth along the lines of the correspondence theory of truth. Kant writes in the Critique of Pure Reason: "The nominal definition of truth, namely that it is the agreement of cognition with its object, is here granted and presupposed". However, Kant denies that this correspondence definition of truth provides us with a test or criterion to establish which judgements are true. Kant states in his logic lectures:
[...] Truth, it is said, consists in the agreement of cognition with its object. In consequence of this mere nominal definition, my cognition, to count as true, is supposed to agree with its object. Now I can compare the object with my cognition, however, only by cognizing it. Hence my cognition is supposed to confirm itself, which is far short of being sufficient for truth. For since the object is outside me, the cognition in me, all I can ever pass judgement on is whether my cognition of the object agrees with my cognition of the object.

The ancients called such a circle in explanation a diallelon. And actually the logicians were always reproached with this mistake by the sceptics, who observed that with this definition of truth it is just as when someone makes a statement before a court and in doing so appeals to a witness with whom no one is acquainted, but who wants to establish his credibility by maintaining that the one who called him as witness is an honest man. The accusation was grounded, too. Only the solution of the indicated problem is impossible without qualification and for every man. [...]
This passage makes use of his distinction between nominal and real definitions. A nominal definition explains the meaning of a linguistic expression. A real definition describes the essence of certain objects and enables us to determine whether any given item falls within the definition. Kant holds that the definition of truth is merely nominal and, therefore, we cannot employ it to establish which judgements are true. According to Kant, the ancient skeptics were critical of the logicians for holding that, by means of a merely nominal definition of truth, they can establish which judgements are true. They were trying to do something that is "impossible without qualification and for every man".

Hegel (1770–1831)
Georg Hegel distanced his philosophy from psychology by presenting truth as being an external self-moving object instead of being related to inner, subjective thoughts. Hegel's truth is analogous to the mechanics of a material body in motion under the influence of its own inner force. "Truth is its own self-movement within itself." Teleological truth moves itself in the three-step form of dialectical triplicity toward the final goal of perfect, final, absolute truth. According to Hegel, the progression of philosophical truth is a resolution of past oppositions into increasingly more accurate approximations of absolute truth. Chalybäus used the terms "thesis", "antithesis", and "synthesis" to describe Hegel's dialectical triplicity. The "thesis" consists of an incomplete historical movement. To resolve the incompletion, an "antithesis" occurs which opposes the "thesis." In turn, the "synthesis" appears when the "thesis" and "antithesis" become reconciled and a higher level of truth is obtained. This "synthesis" thereby becomes a "thesis," which will again necessitate an "antithesis," requiring a new "synthesis" until a final state is reached as the result of reason's historical movement. History is the Absolute Spirit moving toward a goal. This historical progression will finally conclude itself when the Absolute Spirit understands its own infinite self at the very end of history. Absolute Spirit will then be the complete expression of an infinite God.

Schopenhauer (1788–1860)
For Arthur Schopenhauer, a judgment is a combination or separation of two or more concepts. If a judgment is to be an expression of knowledge, it must have a sufficient reason or ground by which the judgment could be called true. Truth is the reference of a judgment to something different from itself which is its sufficient reason (ground). Judgments can have material, formal, transcendental, or metalogical truth. A judgment has material truth if its concepts are based on intuitive perceptions that are generated from sensations. If a judgment has its reason (ground) in another judgment, its truth is called logical or formal. If a judgment, of, for example, pure mathematics or pure science, is based on the forms (space, time, causality) of intuitive, empirical knowledge, then the judgment has transcendental truth.

Kierkegaard (1813–1855)
When Søren Kierkegaard, as his character Johannes Climacus, ends his writings: My thesis was, subjectivity, heartfelt is the truth, he does not advocate for subjectivism in its extreme form (the theory that something is true simply because one believes it to be so), but rather that the objective approach to matters of personal truth cannot shed any light upon that which is most essential to a person's life. Objective truths are concerned with the facts of a person's being, while subjective truths are concerned with a person's way of being. Kierkegaard agrees that objective truths for the study of subjects like mathematics, science, and history are relevant and necessary, but argues that objective truths do not shed any light on a person's inner relationship to existence. At best, these truths can only provide a severely narrowed perspective that has little to do with one's actual experience of life.

While objective truths are final and static, subjective truths are continuing and dynamic. The truth of one's existence is a living, inward, and subjective experience that is always in the process of becoming. The values, morals, and spiritual approaches a person adopts, while not denying the existence of objective truths of those beliefs, can only become truly known when they have been inwardly appropriated through subjective experience. Thus, Kierkegaard criticizes all systematic philosophies which attempt to know life or the truth of existence via theories and objective knowledge about reality. As Kierkegaard claims, human truth is something that is continually occurring, and a human being cannot find truth separate from the subjective experience of one's own existing, defined by the values and fundamental essence that consist of one's way of life.

Nietzsche (1844–1900)
Friedrich Nietzsche believed the search for truth, or 'the will to truth', was a consequence of the will to power of philosophers. He thought that truth should be used as long as it promoted life and the will to power, and he thought untruth was better than truth if it had this life enhancement as a consequence. As he wrote in Beyond Good and Evil, "The falseness of a judgment is to us not necessarily an objection to a judgment... The question is to what extent it is life-advancing, life-preserving, species-preserving, perhaps even species-breeding..." (aphorism 4). He proposed the will to power as a truth only because, according to him, it was the most life-affirming and sincere perspective one could have.

Robert Wicks discusses Nietzsche's basic view of truth as follows:
[...] Some scholars regard Nietzsche's 1873 unpublished essay, "On Truth and Lies in a Nonmoral Sense" ("Über Wahrheit und Lüge im außermoralischen Sinn") as a keystone in his thought. In this essay, Nietzsche rejects the idea of universal constants, and claims that what we call "truth" is only "a mobile army of metaphors, metonyms, and anthropomorphisms." His view at this time is that arbitrariness completely prevails within human experience: concepts originate via the very artistic transference of nerve stimuli into images; "truth" is nothing more than the invention of fixed conventions for merely practical purposes, especially those of repose, security and consistence. [...]

Separately Nietzsche suggested that an ancient, metaphysical belief in the divinity of Truth lies at the heart of and has served as the foundation for the entire subsequent Western intellectual tradition: "But you will have gathered what I am getting at, namely, that it is still a metaphysical faith on which our faith in science rests—that even we knowers of today, we godless anti-metaphysicians still take our fire too, from the flame lit by the thousand-year old faith, the Christian faith which was also Plato's faith, that God is Truth; that Truth is 'Divine'..."

Heidegger (1889–1976)
Other philosophers take this common meaning to be secondary and derivative. According to Martin Heidegger, the original meaning and essence of truth in Ancient Greece was unconcealment, or the revealing or bringing of what was previously hidden into the open, as indicated by the original Greek term for truth, aletheia. On this view, the conception of truth as correctness is a later derivation from the concept's original essence, a development Heidegger traces to the Latin term veritas. Owing to the primacy of ontology in Heidegger's philosophy, he considered this truth to lie within Being itself, and already in Being and Time (1927) had identified truth with "being-truth" or the "truth of Being" and partially with the Kantian thing-in-itself in an epistemology essentially concerning a mode of Dasein.

Sartre (1905–1980) 
In Being and Nothingness (1943), partially following Heidegger, Jean-Paul Sartre identified our knowledge of the truth as a relation between the in-itself and for-itself of being - yet simultaneously closely connected in this vein to the data available to the material personhood, in the body, of an individual in their interaction with the world and others - with Sartre's description that "the world is human" allowing him to postulate all truth as strictly understood by self-consciousness as self-consciousness of something, a view also preceded by Henri Bergson in Time and Free Will (1889), the reading of which Sartre had credited for his interest in philosophy. This first existentialist theory, more fully fleshed out in Sartre's essay Truth and Existence (1948), which already demonstrates a more radical departure from Heidegger in its emphasis on the primacy of the idea, already formulated in Being and Nothingness, of existence as preceding essence in its role in the formulation of truth, has nevertheless been critically examined as idealist rather than materialist in its departure from more traditional idealist epistemologies such as those of Ancient Greek philosophy in Plato and Aristotle, and staying as does Heidegger with Kant.

Later, in the Search for a Method (1957), in which Sarturused a unification of existentialism and Marxism he would later formulate in the Critique of Dialectical Reason (1960), Sartre, with his growing emphasis on the Hegelian totalisation of historicity, posited a conception of truth still defined by its process of relation to a container giving it material meaning, but with specfiic reference to a role in this broader totalisation, for "subjectivity is neither everything nor nothing; it represents a moment in the objective process (that in which externality is internalised), and this moment is perpetually eliminated only to be perpetually reborn": "For us, truth is something which becomes, it has and will have become. It is a totalisation which is forever being totalised. Particular facts do not signify anything; they are neither true nor false so long as they are not related, through the mediation of various partial totalities, to the totalisation in process." Sartre describes this as a "realistic epistemology", developed out of Marx's ideas but with such a development only possible in an existentialist light, as with the theme of the whole work. In an early segment of the lengthy two-volume Critique of 1960, Sartre continued to describe truth as a "totalising" "truth of history" to be interpreted by a "Marxist historian", whilst his break with Heidegger's epistemological ideas is finalised in the description of a seemingly antinomous "dualism of Being and Truth" as the essence of a truly Marxist epistemology.

Camus (1913–1960) 
The well-regarded French philosopher Albert Camus wrote in his famous essay, The Myth of Sisyphus (1942), that "there are truths but no truth", in fundamental agreement with Nietzsche's perspectivism, and favourably cites Kierkergaad in posing that "no truth is absolute or can render satisfactory an existence that is impossible in itself". Later, in The Rebel (1951), he declared, akin to Sartre, that "the very lowest form of truth" is "the truth of history", but describes this in the context of its abuse and like Kierkergaad in the Concluding Unscientific Postscript he criticizes Hegel in holding a historical attitude "which consists of saying: 'This is truth, which appears to us, however, to be error, but which is true precisely because it happens to be error. As for proof, it is not I, but history, at its conclusion, that will furnish it.'"

Whitehead (1861–1947)
Alfred North Whitehead, a British mathematician who became an American philosopher, said: "There are no whole truths; all truths are half-truths. It is trying to treat them as whole truths that plays the devil".

The logical progression or connection of this line of thought is to conclude that truth can lie, since half-truths are deceptive and may lead to a false conclusion.

Peirce (1839–1914)
Pragmatists like C. S. Peirce take truth to have some manner of essential relation to human practices for inquiring into and discovering truth, with Peirce himself holding that truth is what human inquiry would find out on a matter, if our practice of inquiry were taken as far as it could profitably go: "The opinion which is fated to be ultimately agreed to by all who investigate, is what we mean by the truth..."

Nishida (1870–1945)
According to Kitaro Nishida, "knowledge of things in the world begins with the differentiation of unitary consciousness into knower and known and ends with self and things becoming one again. Such unification takes form not only in knowing but in the valuing (of truth) that directs knowing, the willing that directs action, and the feeling or emotive reach that directs sensing."

Fromm (1900–1980)
Erich Fromm finds that trying to discuss truth as "absolute truth" is sterile and that emphasis ought to be placed on "optimal truth". He considers truth as stemming from the survival imperative of grasping one's environment physically and intellectually, whereby young children instinctively seek truth so as to orient themselves in "a strange and powerful world". The accuracy of their perceived approximation of the truth will therefore have direct consequences on their ability to deal with their environment. Fromm can be understood to define truth as a functional approximation of reality. His vision of optimal truth is described partly in Man for Himself: An Inquiry into the Psychology of Ethics (1947), from which excerpts are included below.

 the dichotomy between 'absolute = perfect' and 'relative = imperfect' has been superseded in all fields of scientific thought, where "it is generally recognized that there is no absolute truth but nevertheless that there are objectively valid laws and principles".

 In that respect, "a scientifically or rationally valid statement means that the power of reason is applied to all the available data of observation without any of them being suppressed or falsified for the sake of the desired result". The history of science is "a history of inadequate and incomplete statements, and every new insight makes possible the recognition of the inadequacies of previous propositions and offers a springboard for creating a more adequate formulation."

 As a result "the history of thought is the history of an ever-increasing approximation to the truth. Scientific knowledge is not absolute but optimal; it contains the optimum of truth attainable in a given historical period." Fromm furthermore notes that "different cultures have emphasized various aspects of the truth" and that increasing interaction between cultures allows for these aspects to reconcile and integrate, increasing further the approximation to the truth.

Foucault (1926–1984)

Truth, says Michel Foucault, is problematic when any attempt is made to see truth as an "objective" quality. He prefers not to use the term truth itself but "Regimes of Truth". In his historical investigations he found truth to be something that was itself a part of, or embedded within, a given power structure. Thus Foucault's view shares much in common with the concepts of Nietzsche. Truth for Foucault is also something that shifts through various episteme throughout history.

Baudrillard (1929–2007)
Jean Baudrillard considered truth to be largely simulated, that is pretending to have something, as opposed to dissimulation, pretending to not have something. He took his cue from iconoclasts whom he claims knew that images of God demonstrated that God did not exist. Baudrillard wrote in "Precession of the Simulacra":
The simulacrum is never that which conceals the truth—it is the truth which conceals that there is none. The simulacrum is true.
—Ecclesiastes

Some examples of simulacra that Baudrillard cited were: that prisons simulate the "truth" that society is free; scandals (e.g., Watergate) simulate that corruption is corrected; Disney simulates that the U.S. itself is an adult place. Though such examples seem extreme, such extremity is an important part of Baudrillard's theory. For a less extreme example, movies usually end with the bad being punished, humiliated, or otherwise failing, thus affirming for viewers the concept that the good end happily and the bad unhappily, a narrative which implies that the status quo and established power structures are largely legitimate.

Other contemporary positions 
Truthmaker theory is "the branch of metaphysics that explores the relationships between what is true and what exists". It is different from substantive theories of truth in the sense that it doesn't aim at giving a definition of what truth is. Instead, it has the goal of determining how truth depends on being.

Theological views

Hinduism
In Hinduism, truth is defined as "unchangeable", "that which has no distortion", "that which is beyond distinctions of time, space, and person", "that which pervades the universe in all its constancy". The human body, therefore, is not completely true as it changes with time, for example. There are many references, properties and explanations of truth by Hindu sages that explain varied facets of truth, such as the national motto of India: "Satyameva Jayate" (Truth alone wins), as well as "Satyam muktaye" (Truth liberates), "Satya' is 'Parahit'artham' va'unmanaso yatha'rthatvam' satyam" (Satya is the benevolent use of words and the mind for the welfare of others or in other words responsibilities is truth too), "When one is firmly established in speaking truth, the fruits of action become subservient to him (patanjali yogasutras, sutra number 2.36), "The face of truth is covered by a golden bowl. Unveil it, O Pusan (Sun), so that I who have truth as my duty (satyadharma) may see it!" (Brhadaranyaka V 15 1–4 and the brief IIsa Upanisad 15–18), Truth is superior to silence (Manusmriti), etc. Combined with other words, satya acts as a modifier, like ultra or highest, or more literally truest, connoting purity and excellence. For example, satyaloka is the "highest heaven" and Satya Yuga is the "golden age" or best of the four cyclical cosmic ages in Hinduism, and so on.

Buddhism
In Buddhism, particularly in the Mahayana tradition, the notion of truth is often divided into the two truths doctrine, which consists of relative or conventional truth and ultimate truth. The former refers to truth that is based on common understanding among ordinary people and is accepted as a practical basis for communication of higher truths. Ultimate truth necessarily transcends logic in the sphere of ordinary experience, and recognizes such phenomena as illusory. Mādhyamaka philosophy asserts that any doctrine can be analyzed with both divisions of truth. Affirmation and negation belong to relative and absolute truth respectively. Political law is regarded as relative, while religious law is absolute.

Christianity

Christianity has a soteriological view of truth. According to the Bible in John 14:6, Jesus is quoted as having said "I am the way, the truth and the life: no man cometh unto the Father, but by me".

See also

 Asha
 Confirmation holism
 Contextualism
 Degree of truth
 Disposition
 Eclecticism
 Epistemic theories of truth
 Imagination
 Independence (probability theory)
 Invariant (mathematics)
 McNamara fallacy
 Normative science
 On Truth and Lies in a Nonmoral Sense
 Perspectivism
 Physical symbol system
 Public opinion
 Relativism
 Religious views on truth
 Revision theory
 Slingshot argument
 Subjectivity
 Tautology (logic)
 Tautology (rhetoric)
 Theory of justification
 Truth prevails
 Truthiness
 Unity of the proposition
 Verisimilitude

Other theorists

 Augustine of Hippo
 Brand Blanshard
 Hartry Field
 Gottlob Frege
 Paul Horwich
 Harold Joachim
 Karl Popper

Notes

References

 Aristotle, "The Categories", Harold P. Cooke (trans.), pp. 1–109 in Aristotle, Volume 1, Loeb Classical Library, William Heinemann, London, 1938.
 Aristotle, "On Interpretation", Harold P. Cooke (trans.), pp. 111–79 in Aristotle, Volume 1, Loeb Classical Library, William Heinemann, London, 1938.
 Aristotle, "Prior Analytics", Hugh Tredennick (trans.), pp. 181–531 in Aristotle, Volume 1, Loeb Classical Library, William Heinemann, London, 1938.
 Aristotle, "On the Soul" (De Anima), W. S. Hett (trans.), pp. 1–203 in Aristotle, Volume 8, Loeb Classical Library, William Heinemann, London, 1936.
 Audi, Robert (ed., 1999), The Cambridge Dictionary of Philosophy, Cambridge University Press, Cambridge, 1995. 2nd edition, 1999. Cited as CDP.
 Baldwin, James Mark (ed., 1901–1905), Dictionary of Philosophy and Psychology, 3 volumes in 4, Macmillan, New York.
 Baylis, Charles A. (1962), "Truth", pp. 321–22 in Dagobert D. Runes (ed.), Dictionary of Philosophy, Littlefield, Adams, and Company, Totowa, NJ.
 Benjamin, A. Cornelius (1962), "Coherence Theory of Truth", p. 58 in Dagobert D. Runes (ed.), Dictionary of Philosophy, Littlefield, Adams, and Company, Totowa, NJ.
 Blackburn, Simon, and Simmons, Keith (eds., 1999), Truth, Oxford University Press, Oxford. Includes papers by James, Ramsey, Russell, Tarski, and more recent work.
 Chandrasekhar, Subrahmanyan (1987), Truth and Beauty. Aesthetics and Motivations in Science, University of Chicago Press, Chicago, IL.
 Chang, C.C., and Keisler, H.J., Model Theory, North-Holland, Amsterdam, Netherlands, 1973.
 Chomsky, Noam (1995), The Minimalist Program, MIT Press, Cambridge, Massachusetts.
 Church, Alonzo (1962a), "Name Relation, or Meaning Relation", p. 204 in Dagobert D. Runes (ed.), Dictionary of Philosophy, Littlefield, Adams, and Company, Totowa, NJ.
 Church, Alonzo (1962b), "Truth, Semantical", p. 322 in Dagobert D. Runes (ed.), Dictionary of Philosophy, Littlefield, Adams, and Company, Totowa, NJ.
 Clifford, W.K. (1877), "The Ethics of Belief and Other Essays". (Prometheus Books, 1999), infidels.org
 Dewey, John (1900–1901), Lectures on Ethics 1900–1901, Donald F. Koch (ed.), Southern Illinois University Press, Carbondale and Edwardsville, IL.
 Dewey, John (1932), Theory of the Moral Life, Part 2 of John Dewey and James H. Tufts, Ethics, Henry Holt and Company, New York, 1908. 2nd edition, Holt, Rinehart, and Winston, 1932. Reprinted, Arnold Isenberg (ed.), Victor Kestenbaum (pref.), Irvingtion Publishers, New York, 1980.
 Dewey, John (1938), Logic: The Theory of Inquiry (1938), Holt and Company, New York. Reprinted, John Dewey, The Later Works, 1925–1953, Volume 12: 1938, Jo Ann Boydston (ed.), Southern Illinois University Press, Carbondale and Edwardsville, IL, 1986.
 Field, Hartry (2001), Truth and the Absence of Fact, Oxford University Press, Oxford.
 Foucault, Michel (1997), Essential Works of Foucault, 1954–1984, Volume 1, Ethics: Subjectivity and Truth, Paul Rabinow (ed.), Robert Hurley et al. (trans.), The New Press, New York.
 Garfield, Jay L., and Kiteley, Murray (1991), Meaning and Truth: The Essential Readings in Modern Semantics, Paragon House, New York.
 Gupta, Anil (2001), "Truth", in Lou Goble (ed.), The Blackwell Guide to Philosophical Logic, Blackwell Publishers, Oxford.
 Gupta, Anil and Belnap, Nuel. (1993). The Revision Theory of Truth. MIT Press.
 Haack, Susan (1993), Evidence and Inquiry: Towards Reconstruction in Epistemology, Blackwell Publishers, Oxford.
 Habermas, Jürgen (1976), "What Is Universal Pragmatics?", 1st published, "Was heißt Universalpragmatik?", Sprachpragmatik und Philosophie, Karl-Otto Apel (ed.), Suhrkamp Verlag, Frankfurt am Main. Reprinted, pp. 1–68 in Jürgen Habermas, Communication and the Evolution of Society, Thomas McCarthy (trans.), Beacon Press, Boston, 1979.
 Habermas, Jürgen (1990), Moral Consciousness and Communicative Action, Christian Lenhardt and Shierry Weber Nicholsen (trans.), Thomas McCarthy (intro.), MIT Press, Cambridge, Massachusetts.
 Habermas, Jürgen (2003), Truth and Justification, Barbara Fultner (trans.), MIT Press, Cambridge, Massachusetts.
 Hegel, Georg, (1977), Phenomenology of Spirit, Oxford University Press, Oxford, .
 Horwich, Paul, (1988), Truth, 2nd edition, Oxford University Press, Oxford.
 James, William (1904), A World of Pure Experience.
 James, William (1907), Pragmatism, A New Name for Some Old Ways of Thinking, Popular Lectures on Philosophy, Longmans, Green, and Company, New York.
 James, William (1909), The Meaning of Truth, A Sequel to 'Pragmatism, Longmans, Green, and Company, New York.
 James, William (1912), Essays in Radical Empiricism. Cf. Chapt. 3, "The Thing and its Relations", pp. 92–122.
 James, William (2014), William James on Habit, Will, Truth, and the Meaning of Life. James Sloan Allen (ed.), Frederic C. Beil, Publisher, Savannah, GA.
 Kant, Immanuel (1800), Introduction to Logic. Reprinted, Thomas Kingsmill Abbott (trans.), Dennis Sweet (intro.), Barnes and Noble, New York, 2005.
 Kirkham, Richard L. (1992), Theories of Truth: A Critical Introduction, MIT Press, Cambridge, Massachusetts.
 Kneale, W., and Kneale, M. (1962), The Development of Logic, Oxford University Press, London, 1962. Reprinted with corrections, 1975.
 Kreitler, Hans, and Kreitler, Shulamith (1972), Psychology of the Arts, Duke University Press, Durham, NC.
 Le Morvan, Pierre (2004), "Ramsey on Truth and Truth on Ramsey", British Journal for the History of Philosophy, 12 (4) 2004, 705–18, PDF.
 Peirce, C.S., Bibliography.
 Peirce, C.S., Collected Papers of Charles Sanders Peirce, vols. 1–6, Charles Hartshorne and Paul Weiss (eds.), vols. 7–8, Arthur W. Burks (ed.), Harvard University Press, Cambridge, Massachusetts, 1931–1935, 1958. Cited as CP vol.para.
 Peirce, C.S. (1877), "The Fixation of Belief", Popular Science Monthly 12 (1877), 1–15. Reprinted (CP 5.358–387), (CE 3, 242–257), (EP 1, 109–123). Eprint.
 Peirce, C.S. (1901), "Truth and Falsity and Error" (in part), pp. 718–20 in J.M. Baldwin (ed.), Dictionary of Philosophy and Psychology, vol. 2. Reprinted, CP 5.565–573.
 Polanyi, Michael (1966), The Tacit Dimension, Doubleday and Company, Garden City, NY.
 Quine, W.V. (1956), "Quantifiers and Propositional Attitudes", Journal of Philosophy 53 (1956). Reprinted, pp. 185–96 in Quine (1976), Ways of Paradox.
 Quine, W.V. (1976), The Ways of Paradox, and Other Essays, 1st edition, 1966. Revised and enlarged edition, Harvard University Press, Cambridge, Massachusetts, 1976.
 Quine, W.V. (1980 a), From a Logical Point of View, Logico-Philosophical Essays, 2nd edition, Harvard University Press, Cambridge, Massachusetts.
 Quine, W.V. (1980 b), "Reference and Modality", pp. 139–59 in Quine (1980 a), From a Logical Point of View.
 Rajchman, John, and West, Cornel (ed., 1985), Post-Analytic Philosophy, Columbia University Press, New York.
 Ramsey, F.P. (1927), "Facts and Propositions", Aristotelian Society Supplementary Volume 7, 153–70. Reprinted, pp. 34–51 in F.P. Ramsey, Philosophical Papers, David Hugh Mellor (ed.), Cambridge University Press, Cambridge, 1990.
 Ramsey, F.P. (1990), Philosophical Papers, David Hugh Mellor (ed.), Cambridge University Press, Cambridge.
 Rawls, John (2000), Lectures on the History of Moral Philosophy, Barbara Herman (ed.), Harvard University Press, Cambridge, Massachusetts.
 Rorty, R. (1979), Philosophy and the Mirror of Nature, Princeton University Press, Princeton, NJ.
 Russell, Bertrand (1912), The Problems of Philosophy, 1st published 1912. Reprinted, Galaxy Book, Oxford University Press, New York, 1959. Reprinted, Prometheus Books, Buffalo, NY, 1988.
 Russell, Bertrand (1918), "The Philosophy of Logical Atomism", The Monist, 1918. Reprinted, pp. 177–281 in Logic and Knowledge: Essays 1901–1950, Robert Charles Marsh (ed.), Unwin Hyman, London, 1956. Reprinted, pp. 35–155 in The Philosophy of Logical Atomism, David Pears (ed.), Open Court, La Salle, IL, 1985.
 Russell, Bertrand (1956), Logic and Knowledge: Essays 1901–1950, Robert Charles Marsh (ed.), Unwin Hyman, London, 1956. Reprinted, Routledge, London, 1992.
 Russell, Bertrand (1985), The Philosophy of Logical Atomism, David Pears (ed.), Open Court, La Salle, IL.
 Schopenhauer, Arthur, (1974), On the Fourfold Root of the Principle of Sufficient Reason, Open Court, La Salle, IL, .
 Smart, Ninian (1969), The Religious Experience of Mankind, Charles Scribner's Sons, New York.
 Tarski, A., Logic, Semantics, Metamathematics: Papers from 1923 to 1938, J.H. Woodger (trans.), Oxford University Press, Oxford, 1956. 2nd edition, John Corcoran (ed.), Hackett Publishing, Indianapolis, IN, 1983.
 Wallace, Anthony F.C. (1966), Religion: An Anthropological View, Random House, New York.

Reference works

 Audi, Robert (ed., 1999), The Cambridge Dictionary of Philosophy, Cambridge University Press, Cambridge, 1995. 2nd edition, 1999. Cited as CDP.
 Blackburn, Simon (1996), The Oxford Dictionary of Philosophy, Oxford University Press, Oxford, 1994. Paperback edition with new Chronology, 1996. Cited as ODP.
 Runes, Dagobert D. (ed.), Dictionary of Philosophy, Littlefield, Adams, and Company, Totowa, NJ, 1962.
 Webster's New International Dictionary of the English Language, Second Edition, Unabridged (1950), W.A. Neilson, T.A. Knott, P.W. Carhart (eds.), G. & C. Merriam Company, Springfield, MA. Cited as MWU.
 Webster's Ninth New Collegiate Dictionary (1983), Frederick C. Mish (ed.), Merriam–Webster Inc., Springfield, MA. Cited as MWC.

External links

 An Introduction to Truth by Paul Newall, aimed at beginners.
 Internet Encyclopedia of Philosophy:
 "Truth"
 "Pluralist Theories of Truth"
 "Truthmaker Theory"
 "Prosentential Theory of Truth"
 Stanford Encyclopedia of Philosophy:
 Truth
 Coherence theory of truth
 Correspondence theory of truth
 Deflationary theory of truth
 Identity theory of truth
 Revision theory of truth
 Tarski's definition of truth
 Axiomatic theories of truth
 Heidegger on Truth (Aletheia) as Unconcealment
 History of Truth: The Greek "Aletheia"
 History of Truth: The Latin "Veritas"

 
Concepts in epistemology
Concepts in logic
Concepts in metaphysics
Ethical principles
Meaning (philosophy of language)
Ontology
Philosophical logic
Philosophy of mind
Reality
Theories of truth
Virtue